Reclining Figure: Arch Leg is a sculpture by Henry Moore.

Casts
One bronze, cast in 1969, is installed at the San Diego Museum of Art's May S. Marcy Sculpture Garden, in the U.S. state of California. Two others are in Iran, part of the collection of the Tehran Museum of Contemporary Art, and the Museu Coleção Berardo in Lisbon, Portugal.

See also
List of sculptures by Henry Moore

References

External links

 

1969 sculptures
Bronze sculptures in California
Outdoor sculptures in San Diego
Sculptures by Henry Moore
Sculptures of the San Diego Museum of Art